Alexandria "Zsa Zsa" Riordan-Niechcielska (born August 14, 1990) is an American former figure skater. She most recently competed internationally on the Junior National level for Poland and won first place to get the Gold Medal. She is of Polish and Irish descent.

Personal life
Riordan grew up in Philadelphia. Her maternal grandparents were born in Poland and so she and her mother both speak Polish fluently. Her father is of Irish descent.

Now retired from skating, Riordan decided to pursue a career in nursing and earned her RN and BSN degrees from the University of Pittsburgh in 2014. She is a surgical intensive care nurse. She is currently enrolled in a master's level certified nurse anesthesia program.

Career

Skating career
She competed for the USA representing the Skating Club of New York until the early autumn of 2005. Placing high enough to qualify for the U.S. Figure Skating Championships and represent the USA internationally in Novice, at the Aegon Cup in the Hague, Netherlands.

She decided to compete for Poland as a member of Unia Dwory skating-club in Oświęcim (later changing clubs representing) Warsaw RSK Marymont Skating Club.  Due to ISU restrictions, she was restricted from competing internationally for a full year, even though she placed high enough in the Polish Figure Skating Championships to represent the country internationally. At the same time, she had competed in the USFSA Regional, Sectional, Eastern and Junior National Championships.

She had her international debut in the late winter of 2008. In February 2009, she started in Junior World Championships in Sofia, Bulgaria.

Post-skating career
Skating with Olympic Gold Medalists such as Oksana Baiul, Kristi Yamaguchi, Nancy Kerrigan, Katerina Witt, Nicole Bobeck and Tara Lipinski.  Zsa Zsa was the Guest Skater who auditioned and was chosen to skate in "Diva's On Ice" Show at the Sovereign Bank Arena in Trenton, New Jersey for 2 consecutive years. Also skating half-time for the New Jersey Titans Hockey Team.

Summers were spent training in Lake Arrowhead, California at the legendary "Ice Castles" International Training Center owned by Mrs. Carol Probst, former Ice Follies performer. Elaine Zayak would always travel with her students. During that time, Ice Castles was one of the Greatest Training Facilities in the country. Frank Carrol was head coach for Michelle Kwan, John Zimmerman, Olympic Pairs Champion, Sylvia Fontana, Italian Olympic Champion,  Jim Peterson, an American World and Olympic figure skating dance coach.  Today, all except Michelle Kwan, now coach in Florida, The Sunshine State.

Television
In August 2009, Riordan attended a Miss Polonia-Staten Island Pageant in New York where she met Andrew Ostrowski, Director of Real Live Relic Hunter, and was subsequently recruited as an Apprentice Actress.

Zsa Zsa was also asked to appear on "Saturday Night Live" in December 2010, Season 36. She skated as Meryl Streep in NBC "Ice Show at the Gardens" with Abby Elliott, Paul Rudd, and Paul Mc Cartney.

Competitive highlights
(starts for Poland)

 N = Novice level; J = Junior level

(starts for the USA)

References

External links
 
 Tracings.net profile
 Figureskatingonline.info profile
 
 
 

Polish female single skaters
1990 births
Living people
Sportspeople from Philadelphia
American sportswomen
21st-century American women